Sarah Kate Burke (born 2 January 1982) is a New Zealand former cricketer who played as a right-arm medium bowler. She appeared in 1 Test match, 36 One Day Internationals and 7 Twenty20 Internationals for New Zealand between 2003 and 2008. She played domestic cricket for Canterbury, as well as spending one season with Kent.

References

External links

1982 births
Living people
New Zealand women cricketers
New Zealand women Test cricketers
New Zealand women One Day International cricketers
New Zealand women Twenty20 International cricketers
Cricketers from Christchurch
Canterbury Magicians cricketers
Kent women cricketers
New Zealand expatriate sportspeople in England